Glen H. Turner (March 11, 1918 - December 1, 1993) was an American educator, photographer, and painter. He was an art professor at Brigham Young University.

References

1918 births
1993 deaths
People from Monroe, Utah
Brigham Young University faculty
American male painters
American photographers
Painters from Utah
20th-century American painters
Educators from Utah
Photographers from Utah